List of initialisms, acronyms ("a word made from parts of the full name's words, pronounceable"), and other abbreviations used by the government and the military of the Philippines. Note that this list is intended to be specific to the Philippine government and military—other nations will have their own acronyms.

0–9 
 4Ps – Pantawid Pamilyang Pilipino Program

A 
 AAIIBP – Al-Amanah Islamic Investment Bank of the Philippines
 ACPC – Agricultural Credit Policy Council
 AFAB - Authority of the Freeport Area of Bataan
 AFP – Armed Forces of the Philippines
 AFPCES – Armed Forces of the Philippines Commissary and Exchange Service
 AFPCGSC – Armed Forces of the Philippines Command and General Staff College
 AIR RESCOM – Philippine Air Force Reserve Command
 AMLC – Anti-Money Laundering Council
 ARESCOM – Philippine Army Reserve Command
 ARG – Armed Forces of the Philippines Reserve Command Affiliate Reserve Group
 ASEAN – Association of Southeast Asian Nations
 ATG – Armed Forces of the Philippines Reserve Command Training Group
 ATI – Agricultural Training Institute
 ASCOM – Philippine Army Support Command

B 
 BAFPS – Bureau of Agricultural and Fisheries Product Standards
 BAI – Bureau of Animal Industry
 BAR – Bureau of Agricultural Research
 BAS – Bureau of Agricultural Statistics
 BCDA – Bases Conversion and Development Authority
 BCS – Bureau of Communications Services
 BFAR – Bureau of Fisheries and Aquatic Resources
 BFP – Bureau of Fire Protection
 BI – Bureau of Immigration
 BIR – Bureau of Internal Revenue
 BJMP – Bureau of Jail Management and Penology
 BLE – Bureau of Local Employment
 BLGF – Bureau of Local Government Finance
 BLR – Bureau of Labor Relations
 BMB – Biodiversity Management Bureau
 BOC – Bureau of Customs
 BON – Philippine Board of Nursing
 BPI – Bureau of Plant Industry
 BPRE – Bureau of Post-Harvest Research and Extension
 BSP – Bangko Sentral ng Pilipinas
 BSWM – Bureau of Soils and Water Management
 BTr – Bureau of the Treasury
 BuCor – Bureau of Corrections

C 
 CA – Commission on Appointments
 CA – Court of Appeals
 CAAP – Civil Aviation Authority of the Philippines
 CAB – Civil Aeronautics Board
 CCC – Climate Change Commission
 CCP – Cultural Center of the Philippines
 CDA – Cooperative Development Authority
 CGPA – Commanding General Philippine Army
 CEISS-AFP – Armed Forces of the Philippines Communications, Electronics and Information Systems Service
 CEZA – Cagayan Economic Zone Authority
 CFO – Commission on Filipinos Overseas
 CHED – Commission on Higher Education
 CHR – Commission on Human Rights
 CIAP – Construction Industry Authority of the Philippines
 CITEM – Center for International Trade Expositions and Missions
 COA – Commission on Audit
 COCAFM – Congressional Oversight Committee on Agricultural and Fisheries Modernization
 CODA – Cotton Development Administration
 COMELEC – Commission on Elections
 CRS-AFP – Armed Forces of the Philippines Civil Relations Service
 CSC – Civil Service Commission
 CTA – Court of Tax Appeals

D 
 DA – Department of Agriculture
 DAR – Department of Agrarian Reform
 DBM – Department of Budget and Management
 DBP – Development Bank of the Philippines
 DDB – Dangerous Drugs Board
 DENR – Department of Environment and Natural Resources
 DepEd – Department of Education
 DFA – Department of Foreign Affairs
 DHSUD – Department of Human Settlements and Urban Development
 DICT – Department of Information and Communications Technology
 DILG – Department of the Interior and Local Government
 DND – Department of National Defense
 DOE – Department of Energy
 DOF – Department of Finance
 DOH – Department of Health
 DOJ – Department of Justice
 DOLE – Department of Labor and Employment
 DOST – Department of Science and Technology
 DOT – Department of Tourism
 DOTr – Department of Transportation
 DPWH – Department of Public Works and Highways
 DSWD – Department of Social Welfare and Development
 DTI – Department of Trade and Industry

E 
 EastMinCom – Eastern Mindanao Command
 ECC – Employees' Compensation Commission
 ECCD Council – Early Childhood Care and Development Council
 EMB – Environmental Management Bureau
 ERC – Energy Regulatory Commission

F 
 FDA – Food and Drug Administration
 FDCP – Film Development Council of the Philippines
 FIDA – Fiber Industry Development Authority
 FMB – Forest Management Bureau
 FNRI – Food and Nutrition Research Institute
 FPA – Fertilizer and Pesticide Authority
 FSI – Foreign Service Institute

G 
 GAB – Games and Amusements Board
 GCG – Governance Commission for Government Owned or Controlled Corporations
 GHQ-AFP – Armed Forces of the Philippines General Headquarters and Headquarters Service Command
 GOCC – Government-owned and controlled corporation
 GPPB – Government Procurement Policy Board
 GSIS – Government Service Insurance System

H 
 HHSSG – Headquarters & Headquarters Service Support Group
 HLURB – Housing and Land Use Regulatory Board (defunct)
 HRET – House of Representatives Electoral Tribunal
 HUDCC – Housing and Urban Development Coordinating Council (defunct)

I 
 IA – Intramuros Administration
 IACAT – Inter-Agency Council Against Trafficking
 IBP – Integrated Bar of the Philippines
 ICAB – Inter-Country Adoption Board
 ICC – Investment Coordination Committee
 IDC – Industry Development Council
 IPOPHL – Intellectual Property Office of the Philippines
 IRA – Internal Revenue Allotment
 ITECC – Information Technology and Electronic Commerce Council

J 
 JBC – Judicial and Bar Council
 JELACC – Judicial Executive Legislative Advisory and Consultative Council
 JSOG – Armed Forces of the Philippines Joint Special Operations Group
 JTF-NCR – Armed Forces of the Philippines Joint Task Force-National Capital Region

K 
 KK – Katipunan ng Kabataan
 KWF – Komisyon sa Wikang Filipino

L 
 LBP – Land Bank of the Philippines
 LBP – League of Barangays of the Philippines
 LCP – League of Cities of the Philippines
 LCP – Lung Center of the Philippines
 LEDAC – Legislative Executive Development Advisory Council
 LGU – Local Government Unit
 LLDA – Laguna Lake Development Authority
 LMB – Land Management Bureau
 LMP – League of Municipalities of the Philippines
 LPP – League of Provinces of the Philippines
 LRA – Land Registration Authority
 LRTA – Light Rail Transit Authority
 LTFRB – Land Transportation Franchising and Regulatory Board
 LTO – Land Transportation Office
 LWUA – Local Water Utilities Administration

M 
 MARINA – Maritime Industry Authority
 MCIAA – Mactan Cebu International Airport Authority
 MDFO – Municipal Development Fund Office
 MGB – Mines and Geosciences Bureau
 MIAA – Manila International Airport Authority
 MinDA – Mindanao Development Authority
 MMDA – Metropolitan Manila Development Authority
 MTC – Maritime Training Council
 MTRCB – Movie and Television Review and Classification Board
 MWSS – Metropolitan Waterworks and Sewerage System
 MeTC – Metropolitan Trial Court
 MTC – Municipal Trial Court
 MTCC – Municipal Trial Court in Cities
 MCTC – Municipal Circuit Trial Court

N 
 NACTAG – National Counter-Terrorism Action Group
 NAFC – National Agricultural and Fishery Council
 NAIA – Ninoy Aquino International Airport
 NAMRIA – National Mapping and Resource Information Authority
 NAPC – National Anti-Poverty Commission
 NAPOLCOM – National Police Commission
 NAPOCOR/NPC – National Power Corporation
 NAST – National Academy of Science and Technology
 NAVFOREASTMIN – Naval Forces Eastern Mindanao
 NAVFORRESNCR – Naval Forces Reserve — National Capital Region
 NAVRESCOM – Philippine Navy Reserve Command
 NAVSOCOM – Naval Special Operations Command
 NBDB – National Book Development Board
 NBI – National Bureau of Investigation
 NCC – National Competitiveness Council
 NCC – National Computer Center (defunct)
 NCCA – National Commission for Culture and the Arts
 NCDA – National Council on Disability Affairs
 NCIP – National Commission on Indigenous Peoples
 NCMF – National Commission on Muslim Filipinos
 NCPAM – National Center for Pharmaceutical Access and Management
 NCRCom – National Capital Regional Command
 NCRRCDG – National Capital Region Regional Community Defense Group
 NDCP – National Defense College of the Philippines
 NDRRMC – National Disaster Risk Reduction and Management Council
 NEA – National Electrification Administration
 NEDA – National Economic and Development Authority
 NFA – National Food Authority
 NHA – National Housing Authority
 NHCP – National Historical Commission of the Philippines
 NHTSPR – National Household Targeting System for Poverty Reduction
 NIA – National Irrigation Administration
 NICA – National Intelligence Coordinating Agency
 NKTI – National Kidney and Transplant Institute
 NLP – National Library of the Philippines
 NLRC – National Labor Relations Commission
 NMP - National Maritime Polytechnic
 NNC – National Nutrition Council
 NoLCom – Northern Luzon Command
 NSB – National Seamen Board
 NSC – National Security Council
 NSCB – National Statistical Coordination Board
 NSRC – National Service Reserve Corps
 NSTP – National Service Training Program
 NSWMC – National Solid Waste Management Commission
 NTA – National Tobacco Administration
 NTC – National Telecommunications Commission
 NTRC – National Tax Research Center
 NWPC – National Wages and Productivity Commission
 NWRB – National Water Resources Board
 NYC – National Youth Commission

O 
 OCD – Office of Civil Defense
 ODA – Official Development Assistance
 OMB – Optical Media Board
 OPAPP – Office of the Presidential Adviser on the Peace Process
 OSETC – Office of the Special Envoy on Transnational Crime
 OSG – Office of the Solicitor General
 OTS – Office for Transportation Security
 OWWA – Overseas Workers Welfare Administration

P 
 PA – Philippine Army
 PADC – Philippine Aerospace Development Corporation
 PAF – Philippine Air Force
 PAGASA – Philippine Atmospheric, Geophysical and Astronomical Services Administration
 PAGCOR – Philippine Amusement and Gaming Corporation
 PAOCC – Presidential Anti-Organized Crime Commission
 PC – Philippine Constabulary
 PCA – Philippine Coconut Authority
 PCAANRRD – Philippine Council for Agriculture, Aquatic, and Natural Resources Research and Development
 PCDSPO – Presidential Communications Development and Strategic Planning Office
 PCG – Philippine Coast Guard
 PCGG – Presidential Commission on Good Government
 PCHRD – Philippine Council for Health Research and Development
 PCOO – Presidential Communications Operations Office
 PCSD – Palawan Council for Sustainable Development
 PCSD – Philippine Council for Sustainable Development
 PCSO – Philippine Charity Sweepstakes Office
 PCUP – Presidential Commission for the Urban Poor
 PCW – Philippine Commission on Women
 PDA – Partido Development Administration
 PDEA – Philippine Drug Enforcement Agency
 PDIC – Philippine Deposit Insurance Corporation
 PEFTOK – Philippine Expeditionary Forces to Korea
 PEZA – Philippine Economic Zone Authority
 PFC – Philippine Forest Corporation
 PGH – Philippine General Hospital
 PHC – Philippine Heart Center
 PHILCOA – Philippine Coconut Authority
 PHILEXIM – Philippine Export-Import Credit Agency
 PhilHealth – Philippine Health Insurance Corporation
 PHILRACOM – Philippine Racing Commission
 PhilRice – Philippine Rice Research Institute
 PHIVOLCS – Philippine Institute of Volcanology and Seismology
 PhlPost – Philippine Postal Corporation
 PIA – Philippine Information Agency
 PICC – Philippine International Convention Center
 PIDS – Philippine Institute for Development Studies
 PKOC-AFP – Armed Forces of the Philippines Peacekeeping Operations Center
 PMA – Philippine Military Academy
 PMC – Philippine Marine Corps
 PMO – Privatization and Management Office
 PN – Philippine Navy
 PNA – Philippines News Agency
 PNOC – Philippine National Oil Company
 PNP – Philippine National Police
 PNP-AVSEGROUP – Philippine National Police Aviation Security Group
 PNP-PMO – Philippine National Police Program Management Office
 PNR – Philippine National Railways
 PNRI – Philippine Nuclear Research Institute
 POEA – Philippine Overseas Employment Administration
 POPCOM – Commission on Population
 PPA – Parole and Probation Administration
 PPA – Philippine Ports Authority
 PPP – Public-Private Partnership
 PPSB – Philippine Postal Savings Bank
 PRA – Philippine Reclamation Authority
 PRA – Philippine Retirement Authority
 PRC – Professional Regulation Commission
 PRECUP – Philippine Registry of Cultural Property
 PREGINET – Philippine Research, Education and Government Information Network
 PRRC – Pasig River Rehabilitation Commission
 PSA – Philippine Statistics Authority
 PSALM - Power Sector Assets and Liabilities Management
 PSC – Philippine Sports Commission
 PSG – Presidential Security Group
 PTA – Philippine Tourism Authority
 PTTC – Philippine Trade Training Center
 PVAO – Philippine Veterans Affairs Office

R 
 RDC – Regional Development Council
 RESCOM – Armed Forces of the Philippines Reserve Command
 RITM – Research Institute for Tropical Medicine
 RTC – Regional Trial Court
 RTVM – Radio Television Malacañang

S 
 SAF – Special Action Force
 SALN – Statement of Assets, Liabilities and Net worth
 SARU – Search and Rescue Unit
 SB – Sandiganbayan
 SBMA – Subic Bay Metropolitan Authority
 SC – Supreme Court
 SEC – Securities and Exchange Commission
 SET – Senate Electoral Tribunal
 SK – Sangguniang Kabataan
 SOCOM – Special Operations Command
 SoLCom – Southern Luzon Command
 SONA – State of the Nation Address
 SPDA – Southern Philippines Development Authority
 SRA – Sugar Regulatory Administration
 SRU – Special Reaction Unit
 SSS – Social Security System

T 
 TC – Tariff Commission
 TESDA – Technical Education and Skills Development Authority
 TIEZA – Tourism Infrastructure and Enterprise Zone Authority
 TPB – Tourism Promotions Board
 TRADOC – Training and Doctrine Command
 TransCo – National Transmission Corporation
 TRB – Toll Regulatory Board
 TSRG – Armed Forces of the Philippines Reserve Command Technical Services Reserve Group

U 
 UCT – Unconditional Cash Transfer
 UMPIL – Unyon ng mga Manunulat sa Pilipinas

V 
 VMMC – Veterans Memorial Medical Center

W 
 WestCom – Western Command
 WestMinCom – Western Mindanao Command

Z 
 ZFA – Zamboanga Freeport Authority

See also 
 Acronyms in the Philippines
 List of Philippine legal terms

References 

Philippines
Acronyms
Lists of Philippine abbreviations
Philippine